The Centre Sèvres is a university-level, Jesuit faculty of philosophy and theology on the Rue de Sèvres, in the heart of Paris. It was formed in 1974 from the merger of former Jesuit schools of philosophy at Lyon-Fourvière and philosophy at Chantilly. It is no longer restricted to Jesuits but welcomes men and women, lay and religious.

Studies
Following the Apostolic Constitution of Pope John Paul II on Catholic Universities and Ecclesiastical Faculties (Sapientia Christiana) of April 15, 1979, and the ordinances of the Congregation for Catholic Education, the canonical statutes of the centre were approved by Rome on June 18, 1986. The licentiate, master's degree, and PhD are offered in both philosophy and theology.
The school of philosophy includes special emphases on aesthetics, biomedical ethics, and public ethics and international perspectivesFurthermore it hosts the Ricci Institute of Chinese Studies. The school of theology includes studies in ancient languages and patristics, religions and cultures, and spirituality and the religious life.

There are approximately 250 students from 40 nations in the degree programmes along with around 1,750 auditors, with many from the United States. There are about 40 regular and 90 guest lecturers, from several European countries.

The Centre organizes conferences on various topics, such as "Islam and Christianity: what dialogue is possible?" and "Called in the heart of the world with the heart of God" on secular institutes, along with symposia – "The Jesuits Today".

Library and publications
The centre's library and its stocks in Vanves comprise 190,000 volumes and 850 periodicals, many in English, French, German, Spanish, and Italian, including manuscripts and printed books from the 16th through 18th centuries. Most of the books are works on theology – Biblical exegesis, fundamental and dogmatic theology, new theological currents, interreligious dialogue, ecumenism, morality and ethics, spirituality, history of religions, church history, history of religious orders – and philosophy  – ancient, modern, and contemporary. The Jesuit collection contains over 40,000 volumes on Ignatian spirituality and Jesuit history, many of them original editions. There is also a reference room with 7,000 volumes.

The Centre publishes two journals, Recherches de sciences religieuses and Archives de philosophie and has its own publishing house.

See also
 List of Jesuit sites

References  

Seminaries and theological colleges in France
Educational institutions established in 1974
Jesuit universities and colleges